Mewla Bhatti is a small and Modern village in  the Loni tehsil & block of Ghaziabad district of Uttar Pradesh, near the Siroli & Chirori region of Loni, on the GAIL indane Gas Plant (bantla, Loni) to Rataul & Chandinagar Air Force Station road.

The village had a literacy rate of 70.3% in 2011. The villagers are predominantly hard working farmers, businesspeople, property dealers, Bhatta Company Owner (Bricks kilns) and builders. This Village is famous for its gangsters like Mahendra Fauji Baisla
and Pahelwans like Rajkumar Baisla

References

Villages in Ghaziabad district, India